The pillars on a car with permanent roof body style (such as four-door sedans) are the vertical or nearly vertical supports of its window area or greenhouse—designated respectively as the A, B, C and (in larger cars such as 4-door station wagons and sport utility vehicles) D-pillar, moving from front to rear, in profile view.

Nomenclature
Car pillars are components that support the structure of an enclosed automobile body. This is similar to that of a house with pillars supporting the roof over the floor. Car pillars are designed to stand in near vertical or inclined positions to support the roof. 

The consistent alphabetical designation of a car's pillars provides a common reference for design discussion and critical communication. This is used by insurance companies to identify damaged components and rescue teams employ pillar nomenclature to facilitate communication when cutting wrecked vehicles, as when using the jaws of life.

The A-pillars on each side of the windshield come up to be joined together by the header rail across the top of the windshield. 

The B pillars are sometimes referred to as "posts" (such as a two-door or four-door post sedan).

Design
Body pillars are critical in providing strength to an automobile body. As the most costly body components to develop or re-tool, a vehicle's roof and door design are a major factor in meeting safety and crash standards. Before safety standards, pillars were typically thin. The design of body pillars has changed with regulations that provide roof crush protection. Standards in the United States were introduced in phases starting in 2009 that require enclosed passenger cars to be able to support from 1.5-times to 3.0-times the vehicle's unloaded weight on its roof while maintaining headroom (survival space) for occupants. 

This has meant designing thicker roof pillars that not only provide sufficient strength, but also to incorporate padding and airbags. However, thicker A-pillars block the field of vision and create blind spots). Some designs employ slimmer, chamfered A-pillars on each side of the windshield to help improve driver vision and through the use of stronger alloy steel. The objective of this construction is to meet safety standards and offer crash protection.  

One of the important design elements of modern cars is the A-pillar because its location and angle impact the shape of the front of the car and the overall shape of modern vehicles or what designers call "volume." For example, more forward positioned A-pillars provide for increased interior room and make for less angle and visual difference between the hood and windshield. This arrangement makes the side view of a car look aerodynamic. The A-pillars that are positioned further back on a vehicle are most often found on rear-wheel drive and SUV models. This arrangement provides a greater hood to windshield angle as well as achieving a bigger field of view for the driver, but at the disadvantage of encroaching on interior space.

In the case of the B (or center) pillar on four-door sedans, the pillar is typically a closed steel structure welded at the bottom to the car's rocker panel and floorpan, as well as on the top to the roof rail or panel. This pillar provides structural support for the vehicle's roof panel and is designed for latching the front door and mounting the hinges for the rear doors. As "perhaps the most complex of all the structures on the vehicle", the center or B-pillar may be a multi-layered assembly of various lengths and strengths. 

Closed vehicles without a B-pillar are widely called hardtops and have been available in two- or four-door body styles, in sedan, coupe, and station wagon versions. Designs without a center or "B" pillar for roof support behind the front doors and rear side windows offer increased occupant visibility, while in turn requiring underbody strengthening to maintain structural rigidity. The need for stronger roof structures meant replacing the pillar-less designs with a rigid B-pillar such as the two-door AMC Matador line. To continue capitalizing on the popularity of the design, General Motors broadened their definition of "hardtop" during the early 1970s to include models with a B-pillar although: "up to then, everybody thought a hardtop was a car without a center pillar." The "Colonnade" mid-sized General Motors models were so named because of their pillared structure designed to new rollover protection standards, but marketers continued to advertise them like the true hardtop predecessors. By the 1980s the full-size Chrysler was the last design without a B-pillar and with opening front and rear side windows.

The C-pillar is the rearmost on two- and four-door sedans and hatchback cars and has served as an opportunity for automobile designers "to introduce a little 'design flair' to what would otherwise be a fairly nondescript side view." Most conventional C-pillars are rearward sloping, but reverse-angled have been used to differentiate their designs. Because many modern cars are similar in side view, the designs of the C-pillar have "become an area for stylistic whimsy."

Designs of the D-pillar typically found on station wagons and SUVs have also undergone a transition from function to more of a styling element. As crossover vehicles look similar, "the D-pillar is the only opportunity for any distinction."

Pillars are implied, whether they exist or not; where a design's greenhouse features a break between windows or doors without vertical support at that position, the non-existent pillar is "skipped" when naming the other pillars. Thus a two-door hardtop or a three box designed  coupé  could have its rearmost pillar called the C-pillar even in the absence of a B-pillar. Conversely, additional doors, such as on limousines, will create additional B-pillars; the B-pillars are then numbered, B1, B2, and so forth.

In addition to the pillar nomenclature derived from viewing an automobile in profile, some older cars have a two-part windshield or a split rear window, with the two halves separated by a pillar. Posts for quarter windows (a smaller window typically between the front window and the windshield) are not considered a named pillar.

See also
 Automobile design
 Automotive head-up display
 Blind spot (automobile)
 Driver visibility
 Quarter glass

References

External links
 "Art of Automotive C Pillars"—Flickr photo group created 26 July 2005; webpage accessed 26 June 2022.

Automotive body parts
Automotive styling features
Vehicle safety technologies

sv:Kaross#A-stolpe